The Cradle  is an oil on canvas painting by the French Impressionist painter Berthe Morisot, executed in 1872. It is on display at the Musée d'Orsay in Paris.

History
Morisot represented in this painting her sister Edma Portillon watching over the sleep of her daughter Blanche. The painting was exhibited for the first time in the first impressionist exhibition, opened on April 15, 1874, in the former studio of the photographer Nadar, on the Parisian Boulevard des Capucines. Although some critics praised the painting, it did not attracted much interest and Morisot failed to sell it. Morisot had set the price at 800 francs. The work remained subsequently in the family collection, passing into the hands of Blanche Portillon, the painter's niece and model of the sleeping baby. In 1930 it was acquired by the Louvre Museum. Between 1947 and 1986, it was exhibited at the Jeu de Paume, located in the Jardin des Tuileries and owned by the Louvre, where the main works of impressionism were brought together. After the creation of the Musée d'Orsay, it was moved there.

Analysis
The current painting constitutes the first representation of the theme of motherhood in Morisot's work, which the artist would later regularly cultivated. The canvas reveals the influence of Édouard Manet, a painter whom Morisot had met at the Louvre in 1868 and whose brother Eugène Manet she would marry in 1874. The composition of the painting is based on the diagonal formed by the gaze of the mother towards her sleeping daughter and the fabric of the crib in which she sleeps. ​The diagonal is reinforced by the left bent arm of the mother, to which the small arm, also bent, of the baby responds.

Morisot uses in this painting a reduced number of colors and a fluid brushstroke. The painting reflects an atmosphere of great intimacy, sweetness and protective love. This canvas, together with others like the one Claude Monet made of his son, Jean Monet at his Cradle (1867), attempt a new representation of childhood.

Regarding the title, The Cradle, when comparing it with other paintings that represented sleeping children also exhibited at the Official Salon, Dominique Lobstein states that "before perhaps contributing to an aesthetic revolution, this painting participates in a rhetorical evolution: Morisot abandons all anecdotal picturesqueness and the title take on a tasteful simplicity, intended to immediately inform the viewer of the content of the work and allow him to project himself as in his own daily life".

References

1872 paintings
Paintings by Berthe Morisot
Paintings in the collection of the Musée d'Orsay
Portraits of women